Franklin v. State, 257 So. 2d 21 (Fla. 1971), was a case in which the Florida Supreme Court struck down Florida's sodomy law as being "unconstitutional for vagueness and uncertainty in its language, violating constitutional due process to the defendants."  The court retained the state's prohibition on sodomy by ruling that anal and oral sex could still be prosecuted under the lesser charge of "unnatural and lascivious" conduct, thus reducing the crime from a felony to a misdemeanor.

Issue
The case involved two men, Alva Gene Franklin and Stephen F. Joyce, who were arrested for committing a "crime against nature" during the early morning hours in a parked car near the St. Petersburg waterfront.  Police charged them with a felony, punishable by up to 20 years in prison, for violating Florida Statute 800.01, enacted in 1868, which read:

Whoever commits the abominable and detestable crime against nature, either with mankind or with beast, shall be punished by imprisonment in the state prison not exceeding twenty years.

In the case of Delaney v. State, 1966, the high court had previously ruled that although the common law meaning of "crime against nature" referred only to "copulation per anum and not per os," the courts of Florida had for decades already maintained that  F. S. 800.01 included both oral and anal sex, and that the public could easily find out what the statute meant in that regard:

However, five years later in the Franklin case, the court explicitly reversed itself on this point.

Decision
In its decision, issued on December 17, 1971, the Supreme Court overturned the felony convictions of Franklin and Joyce, which had been upheld on appeal by a district court, and stated:

Thus, consensual sodomy was reduced to a misdemeanor, and the lower court was ordered to find Franklin and Joyce guilty of the lesser crime.

Since the Florida Supreme Court ruling let stand convictions made before 1971, in Wainwright v. Stone two inmates convicted under the 1868 statute, Raymond Stone and Eugene Huffman, brought a case of habeas corpus before a federal court, arguing that the Florida statute was unconstitutional.  The U. S. Court of Appeals for the Fifth Circuit agreed, but on November 5, 1973, the United States Supreme Court reversed the appellate court decision and affirmed the men's convictions in accordance with the Florida Supreme Court's right to declare its ruling not retroactively effective.

Other cases
In other cases after 1971, the Florida Supreme Court held that the average citizen of the time would be baffled by the meaning of "detestable and abominable crime against nature" (written in 1868) but would clearly understand that the phrase "unnatural and lascivious act" (written in 1917) referred to both anal sex and oral sex, and so allowed Florida police and courts to continue with arrests and convictions for such deeds.  For instance, in Thomas v. State, the court said:

We adhere to recent decisions of this Court holding that the words "unnatural and lascivious" as used in Section 800.02, Florida Statutes, are not void for vagueness and that these words are of such a character that an ordinary citizen can easily determine what character or act is intended.

These cases included, among others:

Morris v. State, 261 So. 2d 563, April 7, 1972
Witherspoon v. State, 278 So. 2d 611, May 30, 1973
State v. Fasano, 284 So. 2d 683, October 17, 1973
Thomas v. State, 326 So. 2d 413, December 3, 1975

Legislation

The 1972 Florida Legislature tried but failed to agree on a replacement for the "crimes against nature" statute because legislators could not agree on whether opposite-sex couples should be included in the definition of sodomy or not.  In fact, Dade County senators introduced an amendment to decriminalize all consenting-adult sex, but the proposal was defeated 24-18.  Finally in 1974, the Legislature recodified and retained the "lewd and lascivious" section as a second-degree misdemeanor (punishable by a fine of $500 or up to 60 days in jail), which thereafter functioned as the state's sodomy law, enforceable against both same-sex and opposite sex couples, but primarily used to stigmatize gays and lesbians as criminals whenever the state considered an issue dealing with their civil rights.

The United States Supreme Court's 2003 ruling in Lawrence v. Texas struck down all remaining sodomy laws nationwide, including Florida's, as being unconstitutional violations of due process and privacy.  Nonetheless, as of 2013, the law remained part of Florida Statutes.

In 1977, following the defeat of a gay-rights ordinance in Miami-Dade County in the face of massive opposition organized by the Save Our Children campaign, Anita Bryant urged the Legislature to reinstate the "crimes against nature" law.  Legislators declined to do so, but instead passed a law forbidding adoption by gays and lesbians which remained in force until overturned as unconstitutional by a Florida appeals court in 2010.

See also

Florida Legislative Investigation Committee
Homosexuality and Citizenship in Florida
Lawrence v. Texas
LGBT rights in Florida
Sodomy laws in the United States
 Sex-related court cases

References

External links
 
Eskridge, William N., Jr.  Dishonorable Passions:  Sodomy Laws in the United States, 1861-2003.  New York:  Viking/Penguin, 2008.  

United States LGBT rights case law
Florida state case law
Discrimination in the United States
1971 in LGBT history
LGBT in Florida
1971 in United States case law
1971 in Florida